The 46th annual Berlin International Film Festival was held from 15 to 26 February 1996. The Golden Bear was awarded to British-American film Sense and Sensibility directed by Ang Lee. The retrospective dedicated to American film director, producer and screenwriter William Wyler was shown at the festival.

Jury

The following people were announced as being on the jury for the festival:
 Nikita Mikhalkov, actor, director, screenwriter and producer (Russia) - Jury President
 Gila Almagor, actress and writer (Israel)
 Vincenzo Cerami, writer, screenwriter and playwright (Italy)
 Joan Chen, actress and director (United States)
 Ann Hui, director (Hong Kong)
 Peter Lilienthal, director and screenwriter (Germany)
 Jürgen Prochnow, actor (Germany)
 Claude Rich, actor (France)
 Fay Weldon, writer and playwright (United Kingdom)
 Catherine Wyler, producer and artistic director (United States)
 Christian Zeender, musician (Switzerland)

Films in competition
The following films were in competition for the Golden Bear and Silver Bear awards:

Key
{| class="wikitable" width="550" colspan="1"
| style="background:#FFDEAD;" align="center"| †
|Winner of the main award for best film in its section
|}

Awards

The following prizes were awarded by the Jury:
 Golden Bear: Sense and Sensibility by Ang Lee
 Silver Bear – Special Jury Prize: Lust och fägring stor by Bo Widerberg
 Silver Bear for Best Director:
 Yim Ho for Taiyang you er
 Richard Loncraine for Richard III
 Silver Bear for Best Actress: Anouk Grinberg for Mon homme
 Silver Bear for Best Actor: Sean Penn for Dead Man Walking
 Silver Bear for an outstanding single achievement: Yōichi Higashi for Eno nakano bokuno mura
 Silver Bear for an outstanding artistic contribution: Andrzej Wajda for Wielki tydzień
 Alfred Bauer Prize: Vite strozzate
 Honourable Mention:
 Mahjong by Edward Yang
 Stille Nacht by Dani Levy
 Rì guāng xiá gǔ by He Ping
 Blue Angel Award: Lust och fägring stor by Bo Widerberg
 Honorary Golden Bear:
 Jack Lemmon
 Elia Kazan
 Berlinale Camera:
 Tschingis Aitmatov
 Jodie Foster
 Sally Field
 Astrid Henning-Jensen
 Volker Noth
FIPRESCI Award
Taiyang you er by Yim Ho

References

External links
46th Berlin International Film Festival 1996
1996 Berlin International Film Festival
Berlin International Film Festival:1996 at Internet Movie Database

46
1996 film festivals
1996 in Berlin
Berl
Berlin